Cyril (Cid) Samson (born January 26, 1943) is a Canadian former politician. He represented the electoral district of Timmins—Chapleau in the House of Commons of Canada from 1988 to 1993.

Samson was a member of the New Democratic Party.

External links

1943 births
Living people
Businesspeople from Ontario
Members of the House of Commons of Canada from Ontario
New Democratic Party MPs
Politicians from Windsor, Ontario